This is a list of Canadian films which were released in 2013:

See also
 2013 in Canada
 2013 in Canadian television

References

External links
Feature Films Released In 2013 With Country of Origin Canada at IMDb
2014 Canadian Screen Awards (nominees and winners)
Canada's Top Ten for 2013 (lists of top ten Canadian features and shorts, selected in a process administered by TIFF)

2013

Canada